Baliledu is an Austronesian language spoken on Sumba, Indonesia.

References

Sumba languages
Languages of Indonesia